Voiles is a composition by Claude Debussy for solo piano from 1909. It is the second piece in a set of twelve préludes published in 1910. The title may be translated as either veils or sails; both meanings can be connected to the musical structure (see below). Except for some mild, localized chromaticism and a short pentatonic passage, the entire piece uses the whole-tone scale.

In their published form, the Préludes have their individual titles printed not at the start, but at the end—and in parentheses.

Musical analysis

The composition studies the whole-tone scale intensively, with the exception of a brief six-measure section in the pentatonic scale.

The structure of the piece follows a ternary (A–B–A') form. A begins in m. 1; B begins in m. 42; and A' begins in m. 48. This three-part form is articulated by the dynamic structure: A and A' have only soft dynamics (piano or softer), while B has a wider dynamic from piano to forte. The B section is also set apart by a faster tempo and increased density of notes. Finally, the A and A' sections are characterized by a whole-tone scale, while the B section is characterized by an E-flat minor pentatonic scale. The whole-tone scale and the soft dynamics give the A and A' sections a mysterious and eerie mood. In the B section, the louder dynamics, the faster passage, and the more consonant and familiar pentatonic scale give the listener a break from the eerie tone, allowing a brief moment of clarity.

If interpreting the movement in light of "veils", the eerie, mysterious mood of the A section sounds veiled. The clearer, more open sound of the B section generates an impression that the veil is removed, but returns for the A' section. If one takes "sails" as a possible understanding of the title, that leads to a possible image of a becalmed ship in the A and A' sections, with the clearer, louder, brighter B section denoting a more open sea and sails full of wind. Generally however, there is no clear structure that the piece fits easily into; neither ternary form nor binary form fit in with the style of the piece. Some say (who?) that the pentatonic section forms the B part but, in truth, it is not clear enough to state it is definitely A–B–A. Others argue that it follows a rounded binary form more than ternary form due to the fact that there is an A part, B part and then another bit at the end, concluding all of his ideas.

See also
 List of compositions by Claude Debussy

References

Attribution
This article contains information translated from the corresponding article of the German Wikipedia. A list of contributors can be found there at the History section.

External links
 
 Notes on "Voiles" on Klavier-noten.de
 , Arturo Benedetti Michelangeli

Preludes by Claude Debussy
1910 compositions